The 15th Aerobic Gymnastics World Championships took place in Guimarães, Portugal from June 1 to 3, 2018. The 8th World Age Group Competitions were held at the same place between May 25 and 27.

Medal summary

Results

Women's Individual

References

2018 in gymnastics
2018 in Portuguese sport
Aerobic Gymnastics World Championships
Sport in Guimarães
International gymnastics competitions hosted by Portugal
June 2018 sports events in Portugal